Josep Palau i Fabre (born 21 April 1917 in Barcelona; died in the same city on 23 February 2008) was a Spanish Catalan poet and writer. He was a representative of Catalan literature during the post-World War period and a world expert on the work of Pablo Picasso.

Biography
The son of a painter and decorator, towards the end of the 1930s Fabre began his literary career by writing poetry. He studied Arts at the University of Barcelona, and, during the 1950s, he was an active collaborator in various literary magazines such as Poesia and Ariel as well as being an editor at the La serena publishing house. A scholarship from the French government drew Fabre to Paris in 1945, where he lived until 1951. Afterward, he revoked his Spanish citizenship so that he could be classified as a political refugee.

In addition to poetry, he wrote plays, short stories and essays, including on Picasso. His fictional world draws on eroticism, showing strong dimensions other than those of the standard idea of reality and harshly criticising the idea of a self-satisfied, mediocre society. Fabre was also an active translator, translating into Catalan works by Antonin Artaud, Arthur Rimbaud, Honoré de Balzac, and the book Letters of a Portuguese Nun. His own books have been translated into several languages.

Fabre died at the Hospital de la Vall d'Hebron in Barcelona aged 90 years and was buried in the municipal cemetery in Caldes d'Estrac.

Work

Poetry 
 1942 : Balades amargues
 1943 : L'aprenent del poeta
 1945 : Imitació de Rosselló-Pòrcel
 1946 : Càncer
 1952 : Poemes de l'alquimista (reissued in 1977, 1979, 1991 and 2002, the last a bilingual Catalan/Spanish edition)
 2001 : Les veus del ventríloc: poesia de teatre

Novels
 1983 : Contes despullats
 1984 : La tesi doctoral del diable
 1988 : Amb noms de dona
 1991 : Un Saló que camina
 1993 : L'Alfa Romeo i Julieta i altres contes
 1993 : Contes de capçalera
 1996 : Les metamorfosis d'Ovídia i altres contes

Plays
 1957 : Esquelet de Don Joan
 1972 : Homenatge a Picasso
 1977 : Teatre
 1978 : La tràgica història de Miquel Kolhas
 1986 : Avui Romeo i Julieta. El porter i el penalty
 1991 : L'Alfa Romeo i Julieta, i altres contes, precedit per Aparició de Faust
 2000 : La confessió o l'esca del pecat
 2003 : Teatre de Don Joan

Essays and literary criticism
 1943 : Pensaments
 1961 : La tragèdia o el llenguatge de la llibertat
 1962 : El mirall embruixat
 1962 : Vides de Picasso
 1962 : Vides de Picasso: assaig de biografia
 1963 : Picasso
 1964 : Doble assaig sobre Picasso
 1966 : Picasso a Catalunya
 1970 : Picasso per Picasso
 1971 : L'extraordinària vida de Picasso
 1971 : Picasso i els seus amics catalans
 1976 : Antonin Artaud i la revolta del teatre modern
 1976 : Quaderns de l'alquimista
 1977 : Pare Picasso
 1979 : El « Gernika » de Picasso
 1981 : El secret de les Menines de Picasso
 1981 : Picasso
 1981 : Picasso vivent, 1881-1907
 1981 : Picasso, Barcelona, Catalunya (with Montserrat Blanch, Alexandre Cirici and Isabel Coll)
 1981 : Picasso a l'abast
 1983 : Nous quaderns de l'alquimista
 1990 : Picasso cubisme, 1907-1917
 1991 : Quaderns inèdits de l'alquimista
 1996 : Lorca-Picasso
 1996 : Quaderns de vella i nova alquímia
 1997 : Quaderns de l'alquimista
 1997 : Estimat Picasso
 1999 : Picasso dels ballets al drama, 1917-1926
 2004 : Problemàtica de la tragèdia a Catalunya: obertura del curs acadèmic, 2003-2004

External links
 
 

1917 births
2008 deaths
Writers from Barcelona
Poets from Catalonia
Translators to Catalan
Translators from Catalonia
Premi d'Honor de les Lletres Catalanes winners
20th-century Spanish poets
20th-century male writers
20th-century translators
Spanish male poets
Catalan-language writers